The Belt Line was a former CSX owned freight railroad branch industrial line on the west side of Hamilton, Ohio extending from Belt Junction JCT connection with CSX Cincinnati Terminal Subdivision and the CSXIndianapolis Subdivision. After the rail line closed, it was converted to bicycling and hiking path.

History 

The 2.9-mile Hamilton Belt Railway operated entirely within Hamilton from 1898 until 2012, serving several industries on the city’s West Side. Its prime customer for 114 years was Champion Papers (later SMART Papers). By 1926, Champion was dispatching 18 to 20 cars of paper daily, and bringing in an average of 144 box cars and 55 coal cars each week. In 1926, HBR tracks were purchased by the B&O. By 1940, Champion’s Hamilton mill rail yards had more than 20 miles of track with several steam locomotives shuttling cars around the clock. HBR began losing business to trucks after World War II. It had no locomotives or cars and was worked in succession by the CH&D, the B&O, CSX and, after 1988, by privately-owned short line companies Great Miami & Western Railway then US Rail.

Milepost

References

Hamilton, Ohio
Rail trails in Ohio
Defunct Ohio railroads